Venango is a borough in Crawford County, Pennsylvania, United States. The population was 214 at the 2020 census, down from 239 at the 2010 census, down from 288 in 2000.

Geography
Venango is located in north-central Crawford County at  (41.772815, -80.110813). It is bordered by Venango Township to the north, west, and south, and by Cambridge Township to the east, across French Creek.

Venango is located on conjoined U.S. Route 6 and U.S. Route 19, with Cambridge Springs  to the northeast and Meadville, the county seat,  to the south. Interstate 79 passes  to the west of Venango, but without any nearby exits.

Demographics

As of the census of 2000, there were 288 people, 104 households, and 79 families residing in the borough. The population density was 1,089.7 people per square mile (427.7/km2). There were 112 housing units at an average density of 423.8 per square mile (166.3/km2). The racial makeup of the borough was 96.53% White, 2.43% African American, and 1.04% from two or more races. Hispanic or Latino of any race were 1.04% of the population.

There were 104 households, out of which 36.5% had children under the age of 18 living with them, 60.6% were married couples living together, 12.5% had a female householder with no husband present, and 24.0% were non-families. 17.3% of all households were made up of individuals, and 6.7% had someone living alone who was 65 years of age or older. The average household size was 2.77 and the average family size was 3.11.

In the borough the population was spread out, with 25.3% under the age of 18, 11.5% from 18 to 24, 28.8% from 25 to 44, 21.2% from 45 to 64, and 13.2% who were 65 years of age or older. The median age was 34 years. For every 100 females there were 110.2 males. For every 100 females age 18 and over, there were 106.7 males.

The median income for a household in the borough was $35,250, and the median income for a family was $38,125. Males had a median income of $27,250 versus $21,563 for females. The per capita income for the borough was $15,978. About 3.5% of families and 7.6% of the population were below the poverty line, including 4.8% of those under the age of eighteen and 7.7% of those sixty five or over.

References

Populated places established in 1838
Boroughs in Crawford County, Pennsylvania
1838 establishments in Pennsylvania